Felipe Alexandre Januário Gomes, commonly known as Felipe Gomes or Felipe (born 6 December 1988), is a Brazilian footballer who  plays as a goalkeeper.

Club career
Gomes started his career in the Moto Club de São Luis academies.

In 2012, he signed a contract with the Cypriot side club of Doxa Katokopias.

One year later, in 2013 he returned to Brazil for Paulista Futebol Clube.

In summer 2013 he signed a contract with the most historical club in Greece, the club of Apollon Smyrnis.

In July 2014 he returned to Cyprus for the Ayia Napa F.C. but he resigned his contract a few days later because of personal reasons and he signed a contract with Thesprotos F.C.

In January 2015 he signed a contract with the FK Kruoja Pakruojis, from Lithuania.

References

External links
 

1988 births
Living people
Brazilian footballers
Brazilian expatriate footballers
Doxa Katokopias FC players
Paulista Futebol Clube players
Apollon Smyrnis F.C. players
Ayia Napa FC players
Kalamata F.C. players
Expatriate footballers in Greece
Expatriate footballers in Cyprus
Expatriate footballers in Lithuania
Association football goalkeepers